Løvold is a surname. Notable people with the surname include:

 Ansgar Løvold (1888–1961), Norwegian wrestler and philanthropist
 Halvor Løvold (1875–??), Norwegian naval officer
 Stein Løvold (1944–2015), Norwegian Chief Scout of the Norwegian Scout association
 Thomas Løvold (born 1981), Norwegian curler
 Lars Løvold (born 1951), Norwegian environmental activist, social anthropologist and founder of Rainforest Foundation Norway